NLRP6, short for NOD-like receptor family pyrin domain containing 6, is an intracellular protein that plays a role in the immune system.  It is also known as NALP6, PYPAF5, PAN3, and CLR11.4, and is one of 14 pyrin domain containing members of the NOD-like receptor family of pattern recognition receptors.  As with several other NOD-like receptors, NLRP6's role in immunity is related to its ability to regulate caspase-1 and NF-κB activity.

References

Further reading

LRR proteins
NOD-like receptors